Selva Magal is a 1967 Indian Tamil-language romantic action film, directed by K. V. Srinivas and produced by T. S. Rajasundaresan. The dialogue was written by Subbu Arumugam and the story written by Rajasri. Music was by M. S. Viswanathan. It stars Jaishankar, Rajasree, Srikanth, Shylashri, Nagesh and Major Sundarrajan. The story was about robbery gangs. This film was a box office hit.

Plot 

After a string of robberies, Balaram flees the country abandoning his wife Parvathi and son. Circumstances separate mother and child, leaving the young boy under the care of Sekar, who raises him into a well educated gentleman. Sekar falls in love with Sarada, the only daughter of wealthy banker, Ranganathan. Meanwhile, Balaram returns to the country and, with the help of his stepson Mohan, runs a shady business under the alias, Balasundaram. He targets Ranganathan and plots to claim him, while Mohan sets his eyes on Sarada. Soon, a deadly game of deception is set in motion where everyone is left to confront their past.

Cast 
 Jaishankar as Sekar
 Rajasree as Sarada
 Srikanth as Mohan
 Shylashri
 Nagesh
 Major Sundarrajan as Balaram
 V. S. Raghavan as Ranganathan
 Pandari Bai as Parvathi
 Madhavi

Soundtrack 
Music was composed by M. S. Viswanathan and lyrics were written by Kannadasan and Vaali.

References

External links 
 

1960s Tamil-language films
1967 films
Films scored by M. S. Viswanathan
Indian black-and-white films
Indian romantic action films